Songkalia River is a river in Kanchanaburi Province, Thailand. It joins with two other rivers, the Beak River and the Rantee River, at a point called Sam Sop or Sam Phrab in Sangkhlaburi District to form the Khwae Noi River. "Song Ka Lia" in the Mon language means "over there".

It originates from Roki Creek in the forest of Thung Yai Naresuan on the west side. It flows through a meander in many Karen communities and villages. It is now popular as a destination for kayakers from Songkalia Bridge to Mon Bridge.

References

Rivers of Thailand
Geography of Kanchanaburi province